Dmitry Kadenkov (born May 3, 1972, Penza) is a Russian political figure and deputy of the 8th State Duma. In 2003 Kadenkov was awarded a Doctor of Sciences in Pedagogy degree. 

Kadenkov is a professional trainer. In 2003 he was appointed acting deputy to the Chairman of the Committee of the Penza Oblast on physical culture, sports and tourism. The same year he served as an assistant to the Governor of Penza Oblast Vasily Bochkaryov. From July 2009 to September 2021, he was the Chief Federal Inspector for the Penza Oblast of the Office of the Plenipotentiary Representative of the President of the Russian Federation in the Volga Federal District. He left the post to become deputy of the 8th State Duma.

He is one of the members of the State Duma the United States Treasury sanctioned on 24 March 2022 in response to the 2022 Russian invasion of Ukraine.

Awards 
 Order "For Merit to the Fatherland"

References

1972 births
Living people
United Russia politicians
21st-century Russian politicians
Eighth convocation members of the State Duma (Russian Federation)
Russian individuals subject to the U.S. Department of the Treasury sanctions